Zoo York may refer to:

Zoo York (Central Park), style and social philosophy inspired by 1970s New York City graffiti art subculture
Zoo York (company), American company focused on the skateboarding market
"Zoo York", a song by Oakenfold from the 2002 album Bunkka
"Zoo York", a song by Lil Tjay from the 2020 EP State of Emergency

See also
Zoo York Wall, former graffiti wall inspired by the graffiti subculture